"2 Seater" is a song by American rapper YBN Nahmir featuring G-Eazy and Offset. It was released on March 19, 2020, as the second single from Nahmir's debut studio album Visionland.

Background 
The song is YBN Nahmir's second single released in 2020, with the first one being "Talkin" in January. Nahmir previously linked with G-Eazy on his April 2018 track "1942".

Music video 
The music video for the single was released on March 25, 2020. It was directed by Arrad.

Critical reception 
Jon Powell of Revolt called the song "perfect for the radio or club dance floors".

Charts

References 

2020 singles
2020 songs
YBN Nahmir songs
G-Eazy songs
Offset (rapper) songs
Songs written by G-Eazy
Songs written by Hitmaka
Songs written by Offset (rapper)
Songs written by Smash David
Song recordings produced by Yung Berg
Atlantic Records singles